Following are links to lists of islands of the Americas which relates to all islands associated with South America and North America, including those of the Caribbean.

North America

List of islands of Canada
List of islands of Greenland
List of islands of the United States
List of islands of Mexico

Central America

List of islands of Belize
List of islands of Costa Rica
List of islands of El Salvador
List of islands of Guatemala
List of islands of Honduras
List of islands of Nicaragua
List of islands of Panama

Caribbean

List of islands of Anguilla
List of islands of Antigua and Barbuda
List of islands of Aruba
List of islands of the Bahamas
List of islands of Barbados
List of islands of the British Virgin Islands
List of islands of Cayman Islands
List of islands of Cuba
List of islands of Dominica
List of islands of the Dominican Republic
List of islands of Grenada
List of islands of Guadeloupe
List of islands of Haiti
List of islands of Jamaica
List of islands of Martinique
List of islands of Montserrat
List of islands of the Netherlands Antilles
List of islands of Puerto Rico
List of islands of Saint Barthélemy
List of islands of Saint Kitts and Nevis
List of islands of Saint Lucia
List of islands of Saint Martin
List of islands of Saint Vincent and the Grenadines
List of islands of Trinidad and Tobago
List of islands of the Turks and Caicos Islands
List of islands of the United States Virgin Islands

South America

List of islands of Argentina
List of islands of Bolivia
List of islands of Brazil
List of islands of Chile
List of islands of Colombia
List of islands of Ecuador
List of islands of the Falkland Islands
List of islands of French Guiana
List of islands of Guyana
List of islands of Paraguay
List of islands of Peru
List of islands of Suriname
List of islands of Uruguay
List of islands of Venezuela
South Georgia and the South Sandwich Islands

See also

List of islands
List of islands by area
List of islands by highest point
List of islands by population
List of islands in lakes
List of islands in the Atlantic Ocean
List of islands in the Pacific Ocean

Americas-related lists